The 1931–32 Palestine League was the first complete season of league football in the British Mandate for Palestine, and the first played in an autumn-spring format. Although in previous seasons several leagues were contested, none are recognized by the Israeli Football Association.

The season began on 7 November 1931 and its final matches were played on 27 May 1932. Seven matches were left un-played as a dispute between Hapoel and Maccabi factions within the EIFA following the punishment given to Hapoel Haifa following the events that led to the abandonment of the cup final halted all EIFA activities.

The championship was won by British Police, who finished the season unbeaten.

League table

References
RSSSF
British Police. The First Champions 
100 Years of Football 1906-2006, Elisha Shohat (Israel), 2006

Palestine League seasons
Palestine
1931–32 in Mandatory Palestine football
Football
Football